The 2018 Corrigan Oil 200 was the 15th stock car race of the 2018 NASCAR Camping World Truck Series season and the 19th iteration of the event. The race was held on Saturday, August 11, 2018, in Brooklyn, Michigan at Michigan International Speedway, a two-mile (3.2 km) permanent moderate-banked D-shaped speedway. The race took the scheduled 100 laps to complete. In a photo finish, Hattori Racing Enterprises driver Brett Moffitt would edge out eventual second-place finisher Johnny Sauter of GMS Racing by 0.025 seconds to win his fifth career NASCAR Camping World Truck Series win and his fourth win of the season. To fill out the podium, John Hunter Nemechek of NEMCO Motorsports finished third.

Background 

The race was held at Michigan International Speedway, a two-mile (3.2 km) moderate-banked D-shaped speedway located in Brooklyn, Michigan. The track is used primarily for NASCAR events. It is known as a "sister track" to Texas World Speedway as MIS's oval design was a direct basis of TWS, with moderate modifications to the banking in the corners, and was used as the basis of Auto Club Speedway. The track is owned by International Speedway Corporation. Michigan International Speedway is recognized as one of motorsports' premier facilities because of its wide racing surface and high banking (by open-wheel standards; the 18-degree banking is modest by stock car standards).

Entry list 

*Withdrew.

Practice

First practice 
The first practice session was held on Friday, August 10, at 1:05 PM EST, and would last for 50 minutes.

Second and final practice 
The second and final practice session, sometimes known as Happy Hour, was held on Friday, August 10, at 3:05 PM EST, and would last for 50 minutes.

Qualifying 
Qualifying was held on Saturday, August 11, at 9:30 AM EST. Since Michigan International Speedway is at least 1.5 miles (2.4 km), the qualifying system was a single car, single lap, two round system where in the first round, everyone would set a time to determine positions 13–32. Then, the fastest 12 qualifiers would move on to the second round to determine positions 1–12.

Camden Murphy would be the only driver to fail to qualify.

Full qualifying results

Race results 
Stage 1 Laps: 20

Stage 2 Laps: 20

Stage 3 Laps: 60

References 

2018 NASCAR Camping World Truck Series
NASCAR races at Michigan International Speedway
August 2018 sports events in the United States
2018 in sports in Michigan